Lok Fu Estate is a public housing estate in Lok Fu, Wong Tai Sin District, Kowloon, Hong Kong, near Lok Fu station on the MTR.

Hong Keung Court is a Home Ownership Scheme court near Lok Tung House, Lok Fu Estate. It has one block built in 1999.

History

Lok Fu Estate was formerly the Lo Fu Ngam Resettlement Area and has a total of 23 blocks, 12 Mark I type and 11 Mark II type, built in 1957. As local residents found the name Lo Fu Ngam (Tiger Hill) inauspicious, the settlement was later renamed to Lok Fu (happy and prosperous). A former shrine at the site was moved to a new location in Kwun Tong, which is now within the Tsui Ping Estate. In 1973, the area was renamed the Lok Fu Estate. It started rehabilitation and redevelopment in the 1980s. In 1991, the six blocks in the nearby Wang Tau Hom Estate were allocated to the Lok Fu Estate.

Houses

Lok Fu Estate

Hong Keung Court

Demographics
According to the 2016 by-census, Lok Fu Estate had a population of 9,952. The median age was 50.8 and the majority of residents (96.5 per cent) were of Chinese ethnicity. The average household comprised 2.7 persons. The median monthly household income of all households (i.e. including both economically active and inactive households) was HK$16,450.

See also
 Wang Tau Hom Estate
 Public housing in Hong Kong
 List of public housing estates in Hong Kong

References

Residential buildings completed in 1957
Residential buildings completed in 1984
Residential buildings completed in 1985
Residential buildings completed in 1989
Residential buildings completed in 1995
Residential buildings completed in 1996
Public housing estates in Hong Kong
Lok Fu
Wong Tai Sin District